In classical mechanics, Maupertuis's principle (named after Pierre Louis Maupertuis) states that the path followed by a physical system is the one of least length (with a suitable interpretation of path and length).  It is a special case of the more generally stated principle of least action.  Using the calculus of variations, it results in an integral equation formulation of the equations of motion for the system.

Mathematical formulation

where  are the conjugate momenta of the generalized coordinates, defined by the equation 

where  is the Lagrangian function for the system. Note that the abbreviated action  is a functional (i.e. a function from a vector space into its underlying scalar field), which in this case takes as its input a function (i.e. the paths between the two specified states).

Jacobi's formulation

For many systems, the kinetic energy  is quadratic in the generalized velocities 

although the mass tensor  may be a complicated function of the generalized coordinates .  For such systems, a simple relation relates the kinetic energy, the generalized momenta and the generalized velocities

provided that the potential energy  does not involve the generalized velocities.  By defining a normalized distance or metric  in the space of generalized coordinates

one may immediately recognize the mass tensor as a metric tensor. The kinetic energy may be written in a massless form

or,

Therefore, the abbreviated action can be written

since the kinetic energy  equals the (constant) total energy  minus the potential energy . In particular, if the potential energy is a constant, then Jacobi's principle reduces to minimizing the path length  in the space of the generalized coordinates, which is equivalent to Hertz's principle of least curvature.

Comparison with Hamilton's principle

Hamilton's principle and Maupertuis's principle are occasionally confused with each other and both have been called the principle of least action.  They differ from each other in three important ways: 
 their definition of the action... 
the solution that they determine... 
...and the constraints on the variation.

History

However, Maupertuis applied the principle only to light, not matter (see the 1744 Maupertuis reference below). He arrived at the principle by considering Snell's law for the refraction of light, which Fermat had explained by Fermat's principle, that light follows the path of shortest time, not distance. This troubled Maupertuis, since he felt that time and distance should be on an equal footing: "why should light prefer the path of shortest time over that of distance?" Accordingly, Maupertuis asserts with no further justification the principle of least action as equivalent but more fundamental than Fermat's principle, and uses it to derive Snell's law. Maupertuis specifically states that light does not follow the same laws as material objects.

A few months later, well before Maupertuis's work appeared in print, Leonhard Euler independently defined action in its modern abbreviated form  and applied it to the motion of a particle, but not to light (see the 1744 Euler reference below).  Euler also recognized that the principle only held when the speed was a function only of position, i.e., when the total energy was conserved.  (The mass factor in the action and the requirement for energy conservation were not relevant to Maupertuis, who was concerned only with light.)  Euler used this principle to derive the equations of motion of a particle in uniform motion, in a uniform and non-uniform force field, and in a central force field.  Euler's approach is entirely consistent with the modern understanding of Maupertuis's principle described above, except that he insisted that the action should always be a minimum, rather than a stationary point.

Two years later, Maupertuis cites Euler's 1744 work as a "beautiful application of my principle to the motion of the planets" and goes on to apply the principle of least action to the lever problem in mechanical equilibrium and to perfectly elastic and perfectly inelastic collisions (see the 1746 publication below).  Thus, Maupertuis takes credit for conceiving the principle of least action as a general principle applicable to all physical systems (not merely to light), whereas the historical evidence suggests that Euler was the one to make this intuitive leap.   Notably, Maupertuis's definitions of the action and protocols for minimizing it in this paper are inconsistent with the modern approach described above.  Thus, Maupertuis's published work does not contain a single example in which he used Maupertuis's principle (as presently understood).

In 1751, Maupertuis's priority for the principle of least action was challenged in print (Nova Acta Eruditorum of Leipzig) by an old acquaintance, Johann Samuel Koenig, who quoted a 1707 letter purportedly from Leibniz to Jakob Hermann that described results similar to those derived by Euler in 1744.

Maupertuis and others demanded that Koenig produce the original of the letter to authenticate its having been written by Leibniz.  Leibniz died in 1716 and Hermann in 1733, so neither could vouch for Koenig. Koenig claimed to have the letter copied from the original owned by Samuel Henzi, and no clue as to the whereabouts of the original, as Henzi had been executed in 1749 for the organizing the Henzi conspiracy for overthrowing the aristocratic government of Bern. Consequently, Koenig confined himself to arguing the principle was erroneous.

There was a political and metaphysical dimension to the dispute: the Newtonian-Wolffian controversy. The Prussian Academy of Sciences was then in a controversy over Leibniz's and Wolff's philosophy. Euler, Frederick the Great, Maupertuis, and Voltaire were Newtonians, while Koenig was a Wolffian.

Consequently, the Berlin Academy under Euler's direction declared the letter to be a forgery and that its President, Maupertuis, could continue to claim priority for having invented the principle, and Koenig continued to fight for Leibniz's priority.

Subsequently, Voltaire and Frederick II, King of Prussia, got involved in the quarrel. Voltaire composed Diatribe du docteur Akakia ("Diatribe of Doctor Akakia") to satirize Maupertuis' scientific theories (not limited to the principle of least action). This greatly angered Frederick, who ordered all copies of the pamphlet to be burned. Subsequently Voltaire left Berlin, never to return.

No progress was made until the turn of the twentieth century, when other independent copies of Leibniz's letter were discovered.

See also
 Analytical mechanics
 Hamilton's principle
 Gauss's principle of least constraint (also describes Hertz's principle of least curvature)
 Hamilton–Jacobi equation

References

 Pierre Louis Maupertuis, Accord de différentes loix de la nature qui avoient jusqu'ici paru incompatibles (original 1744 French text); Accord between different laws of Nature that seemed incompatible (English translation)
 Leonhard Euler, Methodus inveniendi/Additamentum II (original 1744 Latin text); Methodus inveniendi/Appendix 2 (English translation)
 Pierre Louis Maupertuis, Les loix du mouvement et du repos déduites d'un principe metaphysique (original 1746 French text); Derivation of the laws of motion and equilibrium from a metaphysical principle (English translation)
 Leonhard Euler, Exposé concernant l'examen de la lettre de M. de Leibnitz (original 1752 French text); Investigation of the letter of Leibniz (English translation)
 König J. S. "De universali principio aequilibrii et motus",  Nova Acta Eruditorum, 1751, 125–135, 162–176.
 J. J. O'Connor and E. F. Robertson, "The Berlin Academy and forgery", (2003), at The MacTutor History of Mathematics archive.
 C. I. Gerhardt, (1898) "Über die vier Briefe von Leibniz, die Samuel König in dem Appel au public, Leide MDCCLIII, veröffentlicht hat", Sitzungsberichte der Königlich Preussischen Akademie der Wissenschaften, I, 419–427.
 W. Kabitz, (1913) "Über eine in Gotha aufgefundene Abschrift des von S. König in  seinem Streite mit Maupertuis und der Akademie veröffentlichten, seinerzeit für unecht erklärten Leibnizbriefes", Sitzungsberichte der Königlich Preussischen Akademie der Wissenschaften, II, 632–638.
 H. Goldstein, (1980) Classical Mechanics, 2nd ed., Addison Wesley, pp. 362–371. 
 L. D. Landau and E. M. Lifshitz, (1976) Mechanics, 3rd. ed., Pergamon Press, pp. 140–143.
 G. C. J. Jacobi, Vorlesungen über Dynamik, gehalten an der Universität Königsberg im Wintersemester 1842–1843. A. Clebsch (ed.) (1866); Reimer; Berlin. 290 pages, available online  Œuvres complètes volume 8 at Gallica-Math from the Gallica Bibliothèque nationale de France.
 H. Hertz, (1896) Principles of Mechanics, in Miscellaneous Papers, vol. III, Macmillan.
 

Calculus of variations
Hamiltonian mechanics
Mathematical principles